The dotted i (І і; italics: І і), also called decimal i (и десятеричное, after its former numeric value) or soft-dotted i, is a letter of the Cyrillic script. It commonly represents the close front unrounded vowel , like the pronunciation of ⟨i⟩ in English "machine". It is used in the orthographies of Belarusian, Kazakh, Khakas, Komi, Carpathian Rusyn and Ukrainian and quite often, but not always, is the equivalent of the Cyrillic letter i (И и) as used in Russian and other languages. However, the letter І was also used in Russian before the Bolshevik reform of 1918.

In Ukrainian, І is the twelfth letter of the alphabet and represents the sound [i] in writing. Ukrainian uses и to represent the sound [ɪ]. In Belarusian, I is the tenth letter of the alphabet. It represents [i]. In Komi, і occurs only after the consonants д, з, л, н, с, and т and does not palatalize them, while и does. In Kazakh and Khakas, і represents , as in "bit".

Just like the Latin letters I/i (and J/j), the dot above the letter appears only in its lowercase form and then only if that letter is not combined with a diacritic above it (notably the diaeresis, used in Ukrainian to note the letter yi of its alphabet, and the macron). Even when the lowercase form is present without any other diacritic, the dot is not always rendered in historic texts (the same historically applied to the Roman letters i and j). Some modern texts and font styles, except for cursive styles, still discard the "soft" dot on the lowercase letter, because the text is readable without it.

History 
The Cyrillic soft-dotted letter i was derived from the Greek letter iota (Ι ι). The dot came later with some typefaces through Western European influence, which similarly affected other Cyrillic letters such as а and е. In the Cyrillic numeral system, soft-dotted І had a value of 10.

In the early Cyrillic alphabet, there was little or no distinction between the Cyrillic letter i (И и), derived from the Greek letter eta, and the soft-dotted letter i. They both remained in the alphabetical repertoire, since they represented different numbers in the Cyrillic numeral system, eight and ten, respectively. They are, therefore, sometimes referred to as octal I and decimal I.

Usage

Rules for usage in Russian (pre-1918) 

 ⟨і⟩ was used before all vowels and before the semivowel ⟨й⟩ except at the end of a morpheme in a compound word, where ⟨и⟩ was used. So англійскій (English) used ⟨і⟩, but пяти + акровый = пятиакровый (five-acre) used ⟨и⟩.
 ⟨и⟩ was used as the last letter of a word and before consonants except in міръ for "world, universe, local community, commons, society, laity" (and words derived from it) to differentiate from миръ "peace"). After 1918, both are spelled мир.
 In a few words derived from Greek, use was derived etymologically based upon whether iota or eta was in the original Greek: Іисусъ "Jesus", from Greek Ιησούς, now written Иисус; also Іванъ from Ἰωάννης, now written Иван. However, since the middle of the 18th century loanwords came to be spelled according to the general rule: Іоаннъ but Иванъ, Никита (instead of Нiкита), Филиппъ (instead of Фiлiппъ).

According to critics of the Bolshevik reform, the choice of Ии as the only letter to represent that side and the removal of Іі defeated the purpose of 'simplifying’ the language, as Ии occupies more space and, furthermore, is sometimes indistinguishable from Шш.

The reform also created many homographs and homonyms, which used to be spelled differently. Examples: есть/ѣсть (to be/eat) and миръ/міръ (peace/the Universe) became есть and мир in both instances.

Computing codes

Related letters and other similar characters 
 1 : Digit One
 Ι ι : Greek letter Iota
 I i : Latin letter I
 İ i : Latin letter dotted I
 I ı : Latin letter dotless I
 И и : Cyrillic letter I another letter that is romanized as I
 Ї ї : Cyrillic letter Yi
 Й й : Cyrillic letter Short I
 Ј ј : Cyrillic letter Je
 Ӏ ӏ : Cyrillic letter Palochka
 Ꙇ ꙇ : Cyrillic letter Iota

External links

References